Simonis and Elisabeth are two interconnected stations on the Brussels Metro serving line 2 and line 6 on two different levels. Additionally Simonis is a railway station operated by the National Railway Company of Belgium (NMBS/SNCB) and a tram stop.

The station complex is situated at the end of the / in the municipality of Koekelberg, in the western part of Brussels, Belgium. Simonis was named after the /, itself named after the Belgian sculptor Eugène Simonis; while the nearby Elisabeth Park, named after Elisabeth of Bavaria, Queen of Belgium, gives Elisabeth its name.

Simonis metro station opened on 6 October 1982 and is a transit station in north–south direction situated in a cutting next to a railway line. It is served as a transit station on line 6 and is a terminus of line 2. Elisabeth metro station is orthogonal to and one level below Simonis and is a terminal station located at the end of Boulevard Léopold II in east–west direction. It opened on 2 October 1988 and is the terminus for lines 2 and 6.

Naming
Between its opening in 1988 and 2013, Elisabeth was also known as Simonis. Until 2009, Simonis was a simple interchange station between metro lines 1A and 2. When the Brussels Metro "loop" opened in 2009, the north-western part of metro line 1A was connected to the other end of metro line 2, making line 2 an imperfect circle line (since a true circular train service is not possible, as the tracks at Simonis/Elisabeth are not connected). This resulted in the current situation, whereby the station complex is served twice by lines 2 and 6.

To differentiate between the two station parts, the north–south through platforms were given the name Simonis (Leopold II), while the east–west terminating platforms were known as Simonis (Elisabeth). However, this did not improve the clarity of passenger information and thus, on 3 November 2013, Simonis (Leopold II) was reverted to simply Simonis, while Simonis (Elisabeth) became Elisabeth. The adjacent bus, tram and railway stops have not been renamed, and are all still known as Simonis.

Rail services
To the west of the stations, trams 9 and 19 call at underground platforms opened on 23 June 1986 (line 19) and 1 September 2018 (line 9), respectively.

To the east of and parallel to Simonis metro station, the National Railway Company of Belgium (NMBS/SNCB) operates a local commuter station Simonis since December 2009. It is served by the Brussels Regional Express Network service S10 between Dendermonde, Brussels, Denderleeuw and Aalst.

References

Notes

External links

Brussels metro stations
Railway stations opened in 1982
Koekelberg
1982 establishments in Belgium